The National Intelligence Superior Service Medal is an award of the National Intelligence Awards Program that recognizes an individual's superior service or a lasting contribution over a long period of time to the United States Intelligence Community and the United States as a whole. The medal ranks below the National Intelligence Distinguished Service Medal, but above the National Intelligence Exceptional Achievement Medal.

See also
 Awards and decorations of the United States government

References

External links

Valor, National Intelligence Medal for